The Men's madison event of the 2016 UCI Track Cycling World Championships was held on 6 March 2016. The Great Britain team of Bradley Wiggins and Mark Cavendish won the gold medal.

Results

References

Men's madison
UCI Track Cycling World Championships – Men's madison